Thammanuthamma-patipatti (Practice in perfect conformity with the Dhamma) is an important Thai Buddhist text which deals with different stages of awakening.

History
The text was originally printed in five parts between 1932-1934 with no author given. It was later associated with Venerable Luang Pu Mun the founder of the Thai Forest Tradition. While no authoritative biographies of Luang Pu Mun credit him with authorship later editions of the text began naming him as author and picturing him on the cover. The text has also been attributed to maechi Khunying Yai Damrongthammasan.

In 2013, Dr Martin Seeger from the University of Leeds' School of Modern Languages and Cultures uncovered evidence that Khunying Yai Damrongthammasan, a Thai laywoman, was the true author of the text. It isn't known why Khunying Yai's name wasn't on the first publication of the text but Seeger had some theories.

Justin McDaniel, associate professor of South-East Asian and religious studies at the University of Pennsylvania, said "You have to understand that authorship in Thailand is never considered to be by just one person. This idea that a single person owns ideas is seen as a ridiculous notion."

Content of the text
Thammanuthamma-patipatti is in the form of a dialogue, supposedly between two prominent Thai monks of the 20th century, an oft used format in Buddhist scriptures. (see Diamond Sutra for a similar format)

References

Thai Buddhist texts
Theravada Buddhist texts